Jiří Marek (Josef Jiří Puchwein) (30 May 1914, in Prague – 10 December 1994, in Prague) was a Czech writer, educator, journalist and screenwriter. In 1965 he was a member of the jury at the 4th Moscow International Film Festival.

Books
 Pečeť věrnosti (1944)
 Vstup do strany (1952)
 Pionýr Feďa (1953)
 Střelnice (1962)
 Blažený věk (1968)
 Můj strýc Odysseus (1974)
 Muži jdou v tmě (1946)
 Vesnice pod zemí (1949)
 Pohádky vzhůru nohama (1958)
 Autopohádky ("Car Fairy Tales") (1965)
 From The Princess Who Never Smiled in Marek's car world: "Once upon the time there lived three Kings: King of petroleum, King of gasoline, and automobile King..." His Petroleumness had a princess who never smiled. The hero of the story is Vendelín the Car Mechanic whose car had all superb equipment, "not to say about pedestrian catcher".
In 1983 a German comedy film  based on the stories was produced by  
In 2004 the band Chinaski with the participation of Jiří Lábus and Lucie Bílá released a double audio CD,  with three fairy tales, and 8  songs
In 2011, a CD with 4 animated films was released, with three based on the original Marek's stories, the fourth being a new one.
 Panoptikum starých kriminálních příběhů (1968)
 Panoptikum hříšných lidí (1971)
 Panoptikum Města pražského (1979)
 OK 096 se nehlásí (1979)
 Sůl země 1, 2 (1981)
 Psí hvězda Sirius aneb láskyplné vyprávěnky o psech (1982)
 Tristan aneb O lásce (1985)
 Čas lásky a nenávisti (1986)

Filmography

The Sinful People of Prague 
Panoptikum města pražského.

References

1914 births
1994 deaths
Czech male writers
Czech journalists
Czech screenwriters
Male screenwriters
Writers from Prague
Czechoslovak screenwriters
Czechoslovak journalists